Goji, goji berry, or wolfberry is the fruit of either Lycium barbarum or Lycium chinense, two closely related species of boxthorn in the nightshade family, Solanaceae. L. barbarum and L. chinense fruits are similar but can be distinguished by differences in taste and sugar content.

Both of these species are native to Asia and have been long used in traditional Asian cuisine.

The fruit has also been an ingredient in traditional Chinese, Korean, and Japanese medicine since at least the 3rd century AD. In pharmacopeias, the fruit of the plant is called by the Latin name lycii fructus and the leaves are called herba lycii.

Since about 2000, goji berry and derived products have become common in developed countries as health foods or alternative medicine remedies, extending from exaggerated and unproven claims about their health benefits.

Etymology and naming
The genus name Lycium was assigned by Linnaeus in 1753. The Latin name lycium is derived from the Greek word λυκιον (lykion), used by Pliny the Elder (23–79) and Pedanius Dioscorides (ca. 40–90) for a plant known as dyer's buckthorn, which was probably a Rhamnus species. The Greek word refers to the ancient region of Lycia (Λυκία) in Anatolia, where that plant grew.

The common English name, wolfberry, has an unknown origin. It may have arisen from the mistaken assumption that the Latin name Lycium was derived from Greek λύκος (lycos), meaning "wolf".

In the English-speaking world, the name goji berry has been used since around 2000. The word goji is an approximation of the pronunciation of gǒuqǐ (pinyin for 枸杞), the name for the berry-producing plant L. chinense in several Chinese dialects.

In technical botanical nomenclature, L. barbarum is called matrimony vine, while L. chinense is Chinese desert-thorn.

Uses

Traditional Asian cuisine
Young wolfberry shoots and leaves are harvested commercially as a leaf vegetable. The berries are used in dishes as either a garnish or a source of sweetness.

Food

Since the early 21st century, the dried fruit, occasionally compared to raisins, has been marketed as a health food, with unsupported health claims about its benefits. In the wake of those claims, dried and fresh goji berries were included in many snack foods and food supplements, such as granola bars. There are products of whole and ground wolfberry seeds and seed oil.

Marketing controversies
Among the extreme claims used to market the product, often referred to as a "superfruit", is the unsupported story that a Chinese man named Li Qing Yuen, who was said to have consumed wolfberries daily, lived to the age of 256 years (1677–1933). This claim apparently originated in a 2003 booklet by Earl Mindell, who claimed also that goji had anti-cancer properties. The booklet contained false and unverified claims.

Such exaggerated claims about the health benefits of goji berry and derived products triggered strong reactions, including from government regulatory agencies. In 2006, the U.S. Food and Drug Administration (FDA) placed two goji juice distributors on notice with warning letters about unproven therapeutic benefits. These statements were in violation of the United States Food, Drug and Cosmetic Act [21 USC/321 (g)(1)] because they "establish[ed] the product as a drug intended for use in the cure, mitigation, treatment, or prevention of disease" when wolfberries or juice have had no such scientific evaluation. Additionally stated by the FDA, the goji juice was "not generally recognized as safe and effective for the referenced conditions" and therefore must be treated as a "new drug" under Section 21(p) of the Act. New drugs may not be legally marketed in the United States without prior approval of the FDA.

In January 2007, marketing statements for a goji juice product were the subject of an investigative report by consumer advocacy program Marketplace produced by the Canadian television network, CBC. In the interview, Earl Mindell (then working for direct-marketing company FreeLife International, Inc.) falsely claimed the Memorial Sloan-Kettering Cancer Center in New York had completed clinical studies showing that use of wolfberry juice would prevent 75% of human breast cancer cases.

On 29 May 2009, a class action lawsuit was filed against FreeLife in the United States District Court of Arizona. This lawsuit alleged false claims, misrepresentations, false and deceptive advertising and other issues regarding FreeLife's Himalayan Goji Juice, GoChi, and TaiSlim products. This lawsuit sought remedies for consumers who had purchased the products over years. A settlement agreement was reached on 28 April 2010, where FreeLife took steps to ensure that its goji products were not marketed as "unheated" or "raw", and made a contribution to an educational organization.

As with many other novel "health" foods and supplements, the lack of clinical evidence and poor quality control in the manufacture of consumer products prevent goji from being clinically recommended or applied.

Scientific research
Because of the numerous effects claimed by traditional medicine, there has been considerable basic research to investigate biological properties of the fruit phytochemicals. The composition of the fruits, seeds, roots, and other constituents, such as polysaccharides, has been analyzed, and extracts are under study. However, no biological effects or clinical effectiveness of consuming the fruit itself, its juice, or extracts have been confirmed, .

Safety

Interaction with drugs
In vitro testing suggests that unidentified wolfberry phytochemicals in goji tea may inhibit metabolism of medications, such as those processed by the cytochrome P450 liver enzymes. Such drugs include warfarin and drugs for diabetes, tachycardia or hypertension.

Pesticide and fungicide residues
Organochlorine pesticides are conventionally used in commercial wolfberry cultivation to mitigate infestation by insects. China's Green Food Standard, administered by the Chinese Ministry of Agriculture's China Green Food Development Center, permits some pesticide and herbicide use. Agriculture in the Tibetan plateau (where many "Himalayan" or "Tibetan"-branded berries supposedly originate) conventionally uses fertilizers and pesticides, making organic claims for berries originating there dubious.

Since the early 21st century, high levels of insecticide residues (including fenvalerate, cypermethrin, and acetamiprid) and fungicide residues (such as triadimenol and isoprothiolane), have been detected by the United States Food and Drug Administration in some imported wolfberries and wolfberry products of Chinese origin, leading to the seizure of these products.

Cultivation and commercialization

Wolfberries are most often sold in dried form.

When ripe, the oblong, red berries are tender and must be picked or shaken from the vine into trays to avoid spoiling. The fruits are preserved by drying them in full sun on open trays or by mechanical dehydration, employing a progressively increasing series of heat exposure over 48 hours.

China 
China is the main supplier of wolfberry products in the world, with total exports generating US$120 million in 2004. This production derived from  farmed nationwide, yielding 95,000 tons of wolfberries.

The majority of commercially produced wolfberry (50,000 tons in 2013, accounting for 45% of China's total yield) comes from L. barbarum plantations in the Ningxia and Xinjiang in Northwestern China. The cultivation is centered in Zhongning County, Ningxia, where wolfberry plantations typically range between 40 and 400 hectares (100–1000 acres or 500–6000 mu) in area.

Ningxia goji has been cultivated along the fertile floodplains of the Yellow River for more than 700 years. They are sometimes described commercially as "red diamonds". The region has developed an industrial association of growers, processors, marketers, and scholars of wolfberry cultivation to promote the berry's commercial and export potential. Ningxia goji is the variety used by practitioners of traditional Chinese medicine.

Wolfberries are celebrated each August in Ningxia with an annual festival coinciding with the berry harvest. Originally held in Ningxia's capital, Yinchuan, the festival has been based since 2000 in Zhongning County.

Besides Ningxia, commercial volumes of wolfberries grow in the Chinese regions of Inner Mongolia, Qinghai, Gansu, Shaanxi, Shanxi, and Hebei.

United Kingdom 
Lycium barbarum had been introduced in the United Kingdom in the 1730s by The Duke of Argyll, but the plant was mostly used for hedges and decorative gardening.

The UK Food Standards Agency (FSA) had initially placed goji berry in the Novel Foods list. That classification would have required authorisation from the European Council and Parliament for marketing. However, on 18 June 2007, the FSA concluded that there was a significant history of consumption of the fruit before 1997, indicating its safety, and thus removed it from the list.

Canada and United States 
In the first decade of the 21st century, farmers in Canada and the United States began cultivating goji on a commercial scale to meet potential markets for fresh berries, juice, and processed products.

Australia 
Australia imports the majority of its goji berries from China, due to how expensive the Australian labour force is in comparison with the countries that have the largest share of the current market.

See also 

 Gouqi jiu

References

External links 

 Flora of China citation for L. barbarum
 Flora of China citation for L. chinense
 United States Department of Agriculture
 Plants For A Future database
 Montana plant life.org

Lycium
Edible Solanaceae
Berries
Dietary supplements
Medicinal plants
Dried fruit
Herbs
Leaf vegetables
Plants used in traditional Chinese medicine
Geography of Ningxia